Brenden Michael Stai (born March 30, 1972) is a former American college and professional football player who was an offensive guard in the National Football League (NFL) for eight seasons during the 1990s and early 2000s. He played college football for the University of Nebraska, and earned All-American honors.  He was drafted by the Pittsburgh Steelers in the third round of the 1995 NFL Draft, and also played for the Jacksonville Jaguars, Detroit Lions and Washington Redskins of the NFL.

Early years
Stai was born in Phoenix, Arizona. Married in 1995 to Jennifer Stai (Harney), Stai has 3 children. Christina (1995), Bryce (1999), and Brianna (2002).

College career
He attended the University of Nebraska-Lincoln, and played for coach Tom Osborne's Nebraska Cornhuskers football team from 1991 to 1994.  As a senior in 1994, Stai was recognized as a consensus first-team All-American and was a member of the Cornhuskers' team that defeated the Miami Hurricanes 24–17 in the Orange Bowl to win a consensus national championship.

Professional career
Stai earned an AFC Championship with Pittsburgh in 1995; the Steelers presented all players with a ring to commemorate the achievement. Stai's ring was stolen in 2000 during a move to Jacksonville; the ring was returned to Stai in 2009 after someone attempted to sell it to Cash4Gold.com.

In eight NFL seasons, Stai appeared in 105 regular season games and started 96 of them.

References

External links
 Detroit Lions bio

1972 births
Living people
All-American college football players
American football offensive guards
Detroit Lions players
Jacksonville Jaguars players
Nebraska Cornhuskers football players
Pittsburgh Steelers players
Washington Redskins players